Charles Stanford Douglas (October 1, 1852 – April 15, 1917) born in Madison, Wisconsin, co-journalist and realtor, was the 13th Mayor of Vancouver, British Columbia, serving one term of office in 1909. He represented Emerson from 1883 to 1888 in the Legislative Assembly of Manitoba as a Conservative.

The son of John A. Douglas, Emerson was educated at Wayland University in Wisconsin. In 1877, he came to Canada, settling in Fort William, Ontario, where he was the publisher of the Fort William Day Book. Douglas moved to Emerson, Manitoba the following year and established a new newspaper, The Emerson International, there. In 1881, he married Annie Johnston. Emerson was the U.S. vice-consul at Emerson, served on the town council and was mayor of Emerson in 1888. He was elected to the Manitoba assembly in an 1883 by-election held after Frederick Burnham was unseated for bribery and was reelected in 1886.

In 1909, Douglas married Elizabeth Manley (née Fisher), a widow, after the death of his first wife.

He died in Vancouver at the age of 64.

References

External links
Masonic Grand Lodge of British Columbia and Yukon

1852 births
Mayors of Vancouver
1917 deaths
American emigrants to Canada
Progressive Conservative Party of Manitoba MLAs
Mayors of places in Manitoba
19th-century Canadian politicians
20th-century Canadian politicians